MGM PG College Sambhal, Uttar Pradesh is a recognised college. MGM PG College Sambhal, is also known as Mahatma Gandhi Memorial Post Graduation Degree College.

The college is ranked B++ by NAAC.

History

MGM PG College Sambhal established in 1971, as a campus of 4.56 acres. The college is situated in Sambhal. The college is affiliated to M. J. P. Rohilkhand University in Bareilly India.The college initially began imparting teaching in Arts Faculty. Earlier college was affiliated to Agra University but When Rohilkhand University was set up in 1974-75, its affiliates to Rohilkhand University.

Courses

MGM PG College, Sambhal Uttar Pradesh gives Degree in Degree in Bachelor of Arts (B.A)., Masters of Arts (M.A)., Bachelor of Commerce (B.Com) and Masters of Commerce (M.Com).

Presented following Universities Academic programmes are being offered in the College at different levels:

Graduate Level

Hindi Literature
English Literature
Sanskrit
Urdu
Sociology
Economics
Political Science
Education
Home Science
Drawing & Painting
Geography
Commerce

Post Graduation

Hindi Literature
Urdu Literature
Economics
English Literature
Political Science
Sociology
Commerce

IGNOU has a study center in the college.

See also

Al-Qadeer Higher Secondary School, Sambhal
Government Degree College Sambhal
Madrasa Sirajul Uloom Hilali Sarai Sambhal

References

Postgraduate colleges in Uttar Pradesh
Education in Sambhal
Educational institutions established in 1971
1971 establishments in Uttar Pradesh